Metal nitrido complexes are coordination compounds and metal clusters that contain an atom of nitrogen bound only to transition metals.  These compounds are molecular, i.e. discrete in contrast to the polymeric, dense nitride materials that are useful in materials science.  The distinction between the molecular and solid-state polymers is not always very clear as illustrated by the materials Li6MoN4 and more condensed derivatives such as Na3MoN3.  Transition metal nitrido complexes have attracted interest in part because it is assumed that nitrogen fixation proceeds via nitrido intermediates.  Nitrido complexes have long been known, the first example being salts of [OsO3N]−, described in the 19th century.

Structural trends
Mononuclear complexes feature terminal nitride ligands, typically with short M-N distances consistent with metal ligand multiple bonds.  For example, in the anion in PPh4[MoNCl4], the Mo-N distance is 163.7 pm.  The occurrence of terminal nitrido ligands follow the patterns seen for oxo complexes: they are more common for early and heavier metals. Many bi- and polynuclear complexes are known with bridging nitrido ligands. More exotic metal nitrido complexes are also possible, such as a recently reported compound containing a terminal uranium nitride (-U≡N) bond.

Preparative routes
Metal nitrides are produced using a variety of nitrogen sources.  The first example was prepared from amide (NH2−) as the N3− source:
OsO4  +  KNH2   →  KOsO3N  +  H2O
Most commonly however, nitrido complexes are produced by decomposition of azido complexes.  The driving force for these reactions is the great stability of N2. Nitrogen trichloride is an effective reagent to give chloro-nitrido complexes. In some cases, even N2 and nitriles can serve as sources of nitride ligands.

Reactions of nitrido ligands
The nitride ligand can be both electrophilic and nucleophilic. Terminal nitrides of early metals tend to be basic and oxidizable, whereas nitrides of the later metals tend to be oxidizing and electrophilic.  The former behavior is illustrated by their N-protonation and N-alkylation.  Ru and Os nitrido complexes often add organophosphines to give iminophosphine derivatives containing the R3PN− ligand.

Interstitial nitrides
Owing to the ability of nitrido ligands to serve as a bridging ligand, several metal clusters are known to contain nitride ligands at their center.  Such nitrido ligands are termed interstitial.  In some cases, the nitride is completely encased in the center of six or more metals and cannot undergo reactions, although it contributes to the intermetallic bonding.

See also
Abiological nitrogen fixation
Transition metal dinitrogen complex

General references

Inorganic chemistry
Coordination complexes